is a former Japanese football player.

Playing career
Ito was born in Niihama on July 27, 1978. After graduating from Ritsumeikan University, he joined J2 League club Kawasaki Frontale in 2001. He became a regular player as center back of three backs defense from first season and played as regular player for about 10 years. Frontale won the champions in 2004 J2 League and was promoted to J1 League. Frontale won the 2nd place in 2006, 2008 and 2009 season. However his opportunity to play decreased from 2011 season. He retired end of 2013 season. He spent his entire professional career with Frontale, appearing in 496 official games for the club and scoring 12 goals.

Club statistics

References

External links

Kawasaki Frontale

1978 births
Living people
Ritsumeikan University alumni
Association football people from Ehime Prefecture
Japanese footballers
J1 League players
J2 League players
Kawasaki Frontale players
Association football defenders